The River Derwent is a river located in Tasmania, Australia. It is also known by the palawa kani name timtumili minanya. The banks of the Derwent were once covered by forests and occupied by Aboriginal Tasmanians. European settlers farmed the area and during the 20th century many dams were built on its tributaries for the generation of hydro-electricity.

Agriculture, forestry, hydropower generation and fish hatcheries dominate catchment land use. The Derwent is also an important source of water for irrigation and water supply. Most of Hobart's water supply is taken from the lower River Derwent. Nearly 40% of Tasmania's population lives around the estuary's margins and the Derwent is widely used for recreation, boating, recreational fishing, marine transportation and industry.

Etymology
The upper part of the river was named after the River Derwent, Cumbria by British Commodore John Hayes who explored it in 1793. The name is Brythonic Celtic for "valley thick with oaks".

Matthew Flinders placed the name "Derwent River" on all of the river.

The name "River Derwent" was officially endorsed on 20 May 1959.

History
The River Derwent valley was inhabited by the Mouheneener people for at least 8,000 years before British settlement. Evidence of their occupation is found in many middens along the banks of the river. The first European to chart the river was Bruni d'Entrecasteaux, who named it the Rivière du Nord in 1793. Later that same year, John Hayes explored the river and named it after the River Derwent, which runs past his birthplace of Bridekirk, Cumberland.

When first explored by Europeans, the lower parts of the valley were clad in thick she-oak forests, remnants of which remain in various parts of the lower foreshore.

There was a thriving whaling industry until the 1840s when the industry rapidly declined due to over-exploitation.

Geography

The large estuary forms the Port of the City of Hobart – the deepest sheltered harbour in the Southern Hemisphere.

The Derwent estuary contains dozens of white sandy beaches, many of which are staples of local activity within Hobart suburbs and include Bellerive Beach, Blackmans Bay Beach, Howrah Beach, Nutgrove Beach, Lords Beach, Long Beach, Taroona Beach, Hinsby Beach, Kingston Beach and Windermere Beach.

Hydro schemes

Until the construction of several hydro-electric dams between 1934 and 1968, the river was prone to flooding. Now there are more than twenty dams and reservoirs used for the generation of hydro-electricity on the Derwent and its tributaries, including the Clyde, Dee, Jordan, Nive, Ouse, Plenty and Styx rivers. Seven lakes have been formed by damming the Derwent and the Nive rivers for hydroelectric purposes and include the Meadowbank, Cluny, Repulse, Catagunya, Wayatinah, Liapootah and King William lakes or lagoons.

River health
The Upper Derwent is affected by agricultural run-off, particularly from land clearing and forestry. The Lower Derwent suffers from high levels of heavy metal contamination in sediments. The Tasmanian Government-backed Derwent Estuary Program has commented that the levels of mercury, lead, zinc and cadmium in the river exceed national guidelines. In 2015 the program recommended against consuming shellfish and cautioned against consuming fish in general. Nutrient levels in the Derwent between 2010 and 2015 increased in the upper estuary (between Bridgewater and New Norfolk) where there had been algal blooms.

A large proportion of the heavy metal contamination has come from major industries that discharge into the river including the former EZ Industries and now Nyrstar Risdon Zinc Works at Lutana established in 1916, and a paper mill at Boyer which opened in 1941.

The Derwent adjoins or flows through the Pittwater–Orielton Lagoon, Interlaken Lakeside Reserve and Goulds Lagoon, all wetlands of significance protected under the Ramsar Convention.

Flora and fauna
In recent years, southern right whales finally started making appearance in the river during months in winter and spring when their migration takes place. Some females even started using calm waters of the river as a safe ground for giving birth to their calves and would stay over following weeks after disappearance of almost 200 years due to being wiped out by intense whaling activities. In the winter months of 2014, humpback whales and a minke whale (being the first confirmed record of this species in the river) have been recorded feeding in the River Derwent for the first time since the whaling days of the 1800s.

The rare spotted handfish (Brachionichthys hirsutus), whose only habitat is in the Derwent estuary and surrounds, was the first marine fish to be listed as critically endangered in the IUCN Red List, in 1996. The fish is threatened by the Northern Pacific seastar's invasion into southern Australian waters. The Northern Pacific seastar (Asterias amurensis), now firmly established in the Derwent, preys on not only the fish eggs, but also on the sea squirts (ascidians) that help to form the substrate that the fish spawn on.

Bridges
Several bridges connect the western shore (the more heavily populated side of the river) to the eastern shore of Hobart – in the greater Hobart area, these include the five lane Tasman Bridge, near the CBD, just north of the port; the four lane Bowen Bridge; and the two lane Bridgewater Bridge and Causeway. Until 1964 the Derwent was crossed by the unique Hobart Bridge, a floating concrete structure just upstream from where the Tasman Bridge now stands.

Travelling further north from the Bridgewater crossing, the next crossing point is New Norfolk Bridge, slightly north of the point where the Derwent reverts from seawater to fresh water, Bushy Park, Upper Meadowbank Lake, Lake Repulse Road, Wayatinah, and the most northerly crossing is at Derwent Bridge, before the river reaches its source of Lake St Clair. At the Derwent Bridge crossing, the flow of the river is generally narrow enough to be stepped across.

Cultural references
The river is the subject of the multimedia performance "Falling Mountain" (2005 Mountain Festival), a reference to the mountain in the Cradle Mountain-Lake St Clair National Park from which the river rises.

The Derwent is mentioned in the song, Mt Wellington Reverie by Australian band, Augie March. Hobart is located in the foothills of Mount Wellington.

Panoramas

See also

 Bridgewater Jerry
 Ferries in Hobart
 Hydro Tasmania
 List of rivers of Tasmania
 Plenty, Tasmania
 Whaling in Australia

References

External links
 Derwent Estuary Program
 Upper Derwent Issues
 
 

Geography of Hobart
Central Highlands (Tasmania)
South East coast of Tasmania
 
Rivers of Hobart
Whaling in Australia
Whaling stations in Australia